Burlak is a Russian surname that may refer to:

 Dmitry Burlak (born 1983), Russian footballer
 Svetlana Burlak (born 1969), Russian linguist
 Taras Burlak (born 1990), Russian footballer

Russian-language surnames